This is a list of '''Wofford Terriers football players in the NFL Draft.

Key

Selections
Source:

References

Wofford

Wofford Terriers NFL Draft